Lady Amritbai Daga and Smt. Ratnidevi Purohit College for Women, established in 1932, is a women's general degree college in Nagpur, Maharashtra. This college offers different courses in arts and commerce and science, home science, Hotel Management etc. It is affiliated to Rashtrasant Tukadoji Maharaj Nagpur University.

Departments

Marathi
English
Hindi
History
Psychology 
Political Science
Economics
Sanskrit
Sociology
Geography
Philosophy
Food Science
Home Management
Home Science
Physical Education
Computer Science
Management
Commerce

Accreditation
The college is  recognized by the University Grants Commission (UGC). NAAC Accredited A status.

References

External links

Colleges affiliated to Rashtrasant Tukadoji Maharaj Nagpur University
Educational institutions established in 1932
1932 establishments in India
Universities and colleges in Maharashtra
Universities and colleges in Nagpur